Cipria is an Italian monthly women's magazine published in Milan, Italy.

History and profile
Cipria was founded in 1994 and published in Milan by Sfera Editore, part of RCS MediaGroup’s RCS Periodici. It specializes in coverage of make-up and related fashion and beauty topics, carries large amounts of advertising and devotes much space to the horoscope.

The magazine has a cover price of one euro and can be purchased from news-stands; however it is also given away free to customers buying cosmetics and similar items from perfumeries and beauty centres.

See also
 List of magazines in Italy

Notes

External links
 Official website

1994 establishments in Italy
Italian-language magazines
Monthly magazines published in Italy
Women's magazines published in Italy
Magazines established in 1994
Magazines published in Milan
RCS MediaGroup